Thurston's Lobster Pound is a seafood restaurant in Bernard, Maine, United States. Situated on Thurston Road, a cul-de-sac off Steamboat Wharf Road, overlooking Bass Harbor from the west, it has been in business since 1993. Its most popular dish is lobster.

History 
Established in 1993 and owned by the Radcliffe family, it was a progression of the original F. W. Thurston Company, started in 1946 by Fred Webster Thurston. Thurston's daughter, Audrey, and her husband, Harvey Moore, became partners in the business two years later.

Thurston died in 1959, and left his half of the business to his grandson, Lester Radcliffe.

Harvey died in 1971, at which point Lester purchased the remaining half of the business from his mother. He remained the sole proprietor for the following two decades.

Michael Radcliffe, Lester's son, and his wife, Elizabeth, purchased F. W. Thurston in 1991. They expanded the business two years later with Thurston's Lobster Pound.

After thirteen summer seasons, the Radcliffes leased the business to an employee between 2006 and 2012, at which point, with the help of their daughter, Elizabeth, they took control again.

References

External links 

 

Buildings and structures in Hancock County, Maine
1993 establishments in Maine
Seafood restaurants in Maine
Restaurants established in 1993